The Department of Infrastructure, Transport, Regional Development and Local Government was an Australian Government department that existed between December 2007 and September 2010. The Department was established following the change of government at the November 2007 federal election, when the previous Department of Transport and Regional Services gained a third outcome.

Functions
In an Administrative Arrangements Order made on 3 December 2007, the functions of the department were broadly classified into the following matters:

Infrastructure planning and coordination
Transport safety, including investigations
Land transport
Civil aviation and airports
Transport security
Delivery of regional and rural specific services
Maritime transport including shipping
Regional development
Matters relating to local government
Major projects facilitation

Structure
During its life, the Department of Infrastructure, Transport, Regional Development and Local Government was accountable to Anthony Albanese as the Minister for Infrastructure, Transport, Regional Development and Local Government and to Gary Gray and Maxine McKew as parliamentary secretaries. Gray's title varied from the Parliamentary Secretary for Regional Development and Northern Australia (December 2007 to June 2009) to the Parliamentary Secretary for Western and Northern Australia (June 2009 to September 2010). McKew was the Parliamentary Secretary for Infrastructure, Transport, Regional Development and Local Government between June 2009 and September 2010.

The Department was headed by a Secretary, initially Mike Taylor, who stood down in March 2009, amid rumours of a falling out with the Rudd Government, and subsequently Mike Mrdak, who took on the role in June 2009.

Notes

References and further reading

Government agencies disestablished in 2010
2007 establishments in Australia
Ministries established in 2007
Infrastructure, Transport, Regional Development and Local Government
2010 disestablishments in Australia
Defunct transport organisations based in Australia